Thomas Brown "Tom" Mellet (29 August 1871 – 29 July 1943) was a South African international rugby union player. He was born in Potchefstroom and first played provincial rugby for Griqualand West (now known as the Griquas). He made his only Test appearance for South Africa during Great Britain's 1896 tour. He played as a forward in the 2nd Test of the series, an 8–17 South Africa loss at the Wanderers Ground. Mellet died in 1943, in Durban, at the age of 71.

References

1871 births
1943 deaths
Rugby union forwards
Rugby union players from Potchefstroom
South Africa international rugby union players
South African rugby union players
Griquas (rugby union) players